The Promotion League, named the YAPEAL Promotion League for sponsorship reasons, is the third tier of the Swiss football league system. Eighteen clubs compete in the league, playing each other twice over the course of the season. The champions are promoted to the second tier, the Challenge League, while the bottom two teams are relegated to the 1. Liga. 

The league forms the semi-professional bridge to amateur football.

Overview 
Eighteen teams play each other twice, once home and once away, for a total of 34 games. The season begins in August and ends in May, interrupted through a winter break from late November to early March. The team finishing in first place—subject to license requirements of professional football—will be promoted to the division above, in turn the last-placed team of the second division will be relegated for the following season. Similarly, the bottom two teams are relegated to the fourth tier and replaced respectively.

It is the highest league in Switzerland that permits participation of reserve teams.

History
The league was introduced as the 1. Liga Promotion beginning with the 2012–13 season as part of a restructuring that saw the Challenge League reduced from 16 to 10 teams. This was done to decrease the competitive gap between it and the Super League by converting it to a purely professional league. The Promotion League would therefore serve as the semi-professional link to amateur football. The 1. Liga was consequently renamed to 1. Liga Classic, before reverting again in 2013 when the former adopted its current name. For its maiden season, six teams were relegated from the Challenge League, while the rest joined from the division below. In March 2020, the ongoing season was canceled after 17 games due to the COVID-19 pandemic and the 2020–21 season suspended until further notice.

The league was expanded to 18 teams for the 2022–23 season and the number of allowed U21 teams is unrestricted.

Participating clubs

Current clubs 2022–23

League champions 
The following teams have won the league:

References

External links 
 
 1. Liga Promotion tables & results at soccerway.com

3
Sports leagues established in 2012
2012 establishments in Switzerland
Swiss
Professional sports leagues in Switzerland